Basketball: A Love Story is a 2018 sports documentary film series directed by Dan Klores and distributed by ESPN Films. The 20-hour series features 62 "short stories" distributed across 10 episodes, with each story varying from five to more than 30 minutes in length and exploring various topics from all aspects of the sport of basketball, including the NBA, ABA, WNBA, college basketball, and the international game, as well as a broad variety of social and cultural issues related to or influenced by the sport. All 62 shorts were originally made available online via the ESPN App on September 18, 2018, and subsequently also aired on ESPN in a serialized format of four-hour blocks over six weeks, beginning October 9 and ending November 13, 2018.

Klores and a team of producers conducted more than 500 hours of interviews with 165 personalities representing all sides of basketball, including players, coaches, executives, and journalists. Interviewees include Adam Silver, David Stern, Kobe Bryant, LeBron James, Shaquille O'Neal, Allen Iverson, Steve Nash, Charles Barkley, Julius Erving, Earl Monroe, John Havlicek, Bill Walton, Isiah Thomas, Moses Malone, David Robinson, Elvin Hayes, Mike Krzyzewski, Doug Collins, Rick Pitino, Phil Jackson, Hubie Brown, Cheryl Miller, Diana Taurasi, Bill Simmons, Stephen A. Smith, Jackie MacMullan, Pete Vecsey and Bob Ryan, among many others. The episodes are variously narrated by Chadwick Boseman, Michael Che, Chris Cuomo, Daveed Diggs, Ansel Elgort, Ashley Judd, Julianne Moore, Robin Quivers, Ahmad Rashad, and Fisher Stevens.

Production

Klores began interviews for a film project that would tell the complete untold story of basketball in 2013, intending at first to compile a total of 10 hours of documentary footage. He quickly ended up with much more material than could fit into that duration, and the film's length was doubled. The entire film consists of 62 short subject films, envisioned as "short stories", discussing a diverse array of topics related to the game at every level, from its origins to its technical aspects, the lives of its players and coaches, and the impacts it has had on society and culture around the world. The stories are deliberately not presented in chronological order. Klores explained: "It’s like opening a book of short stories... Even when it was 10 hours I never intended it to be a series of mini-biographical vignettes, if you will. That would have bored me, frankly. So it’s kind of like 62 different films, just short stories. But the transitions are logical."

Reception

Basketball: A Love Story met with mixed reviews from critics and audiences. Many praised the series' ambitious nature and "unprecedented" distribution format but criticized perceived thematic discontinuities, a lack of depth in certain topics, and equivocation about some of the game's most sensitive past and present issues, including racism, sexism, and violence committed by players and coaches.

Jack Hamilton of Slate criticized the documentary's tendency to gloss over or completely omit these unhappier aspects of basketball history, writing that "the film’s patchwork structure allows it to effectively ignore moments that would complicate its sunny-side-up presentation of the sports’ trajectory", and noted the inexplicable absence of seemingly relevant stories like that of the infamous "Malice at the Palace" brawl. Hamilton and Jen Chaney of Vulture both remarked that several previous 30 for 30 films have covered some of the same stories with much greater nuance and detail.

Episodes

Episode 1

Episode 2

Episode 3

Episode 4

Episode 5

Episode 6

Episode 7

Episode 8

Episode 9

Episode 10

See also

30 for 30

References

Documentary television series about sports
2018 American television series debuts
2018 American television series endings
2010s American anthology television series
American sports television series
2010s American documentary television series